Fabrício Bruno Soares de Faria (born on 12 February 1996), known as Fabrício Bruno, is a Brazilian footballer who plays as centre back for Campeonato Brasileiro Série A club Flamengo.

Career

Cruzeiro

Chapecoense (loan)
On 29 December 2016 Cruzeiro accepted Chapecoense's request and loaned Fabrício Bruno until 31 December 2017.

On 19 December 2017 Chapecoense extended Fabrício Bruno loan for another season.

Another loan extension was set for 2019 season, but Fabrício Burno requested to return to Cruzeiro.

Red Bull Bragantino
On 8 January 2020 Fabrício Bruno transferred from Cruzeiro to Red Bull Bragantino for a €440k transfer fee.

Flamengo
On 7 February 2022 Flamengo signed Fabrício Bruno from Red Bull Bragantino until 31 December 2025 for a €2.5m transfer fee.

Career statistics

Honours
Chapecoense
Campeonato Catarinense: 2017

Cruzeiro
Campeonato Mineiro: 2019

Flamengo
Copa Libertadores: 2022
Copa do Brasil: 2022

References

External links

1996 births
Living people
Sportspeople from Minas Gerais
Brazilian footballers
Association football defenders
Campeonato Brasileiro Série A players
Associação Chapecoense de Futebol players
Cruzeiro Esporte Clube players
Red Bull Bragantino players
CR Flamengo footballers
Copa Libertadores-winning players